Jonathan V Sweedler (born 1961) is an American chemist specializing in bioanalytical chemistry, neurochemistry and cell to cell biology and behavior. He is the James R. Eiszner Family Endowed Chair in Chemistry at the University of Illinois at Urbana-Champaign. Additionally, he holds a faculty appointment in the Beckman Institute. He is also an Elected Fellow to the American Chemical Society, for which he is also the society's Editor in Chief for the journal Analytical Chemistry.

He previously served as director of the Roy J. Carver Biotechnology Center (University of Illinois) and was involved in the genome sequencing of several organisms. Currently his laboratory has facilities in the Beckman Institute for Advanced Science and Technology and the Carl R. Woese Institute for Genomic Biology at the University of Illinois. His research has led to the discovery of some mammalian neuropeptides.

Serving as the chair of dissertation committees at the University of Illinois, he has graduated approximately 60 students with PhD degrees. As of 2019 his publication record includes over 400 journal articles, with an h-index estimated to be in the 60s or 70s.

Education
He graduated with a B.S. in chemistry from the University of California at Davis in 1983 and a PhD from the University of Arizona in 1989. Thereafter, he was an NSF Postdoctoral Fellow at Stanford University with Richard Zare (chemist) and Richard Scheller (neuroscientist) before joining the faculty at the University of Illinois in 1991.

Publications

References

Living people
University of Illinois faculty
21st-century American chemists
University of California, Davis alumni
University of Arizona alumni
1961 births